Kei Koizumi is an American policy advisor serving as Principal Deputy Director for Policy for the Office of Science and Technology Policy. He previously served as a senior advisor on science policy for the American Association for the Advancement of Science after serving as a senior advisor to the National Science and Technology Council under President Obama.

Early life and education 
Koizumi was born in Providence, Rhode Island and raised in Columbus, Ohio. He attended Boston University, where he received his Bachelor of Arts degree in comparative political economics. He then earned a Master of Arts degree in international science and technology policy from George Washington University, where he studied at the Center for International Science, Technology, and Public Policy program.

Career 
Koizumi began his career in science policy at the American Association for the Advancement of Science (AAAS), where he specialized in analysis of the federal budget around scientific research and development. In this capacity, he advocated that government agencies clearly communicate the value of their programs and how they relate to federal priorities. During the Obama–Biden presidential transition, he worked on the Technology, Innovation & Government Reform Policy Working Group. Following the transition, he served as the Assistant Director for Federal Research and Development in the Office of Science and Technology Policy and a senior advisor to the National Science and Technology Council In this role, he also worked within the White House to advocate for the LGBT community in both the federal government and in science.

Following the Obama administration, Koizumi returned to AAAS as a visiting scholar. He continued analyzing federal research and development budgets under the Trump administration, expressing concerns around flat or decreasing investments in science, particularly around addressing climate change and environmental protections. In the winter of 2020, Koizumi worked on the Biden–Harris presidential transition, leading the National Science Foundation Agency Review team. On January 15, 2021, Koizumi was announced as the chief of staff for the Office of Science and Technology Policy.

Personal life 
His husband, Jeffrey Dutton, works in the United States Commercial Service.

Koizumi is also a competitive athlete, winning a gold medal in the 40 to 44 age group for the 110-meter hurdles at the 2010 Gay Games in Cologne. His husband Dutton earned a silver medal in the marathon.

References

External links

Biden administration cabinet members
Biden administration personnel
Boston University alumni
Gay sportsmen
Gay scientists
George Washington University alumni
Japanese-American members of the Cabinet of the United States
LGBT appointed officials in the United States
American LGBT scientists
Living people
Obama administration personnel
Office of Science and Technology Policy officials
People from Providence, Rhode Island
Year of birth missing (living people)
Directors of the Office of Science and Technology Policy